Casatisma is a comune (municipality) in the Province of Pavia in the Italian region of Lombardy, located about 45 km south of Milan and about 15 km south of Pavia.

Casatisma borders the following municipalities: Bressana Bottarone, Casteggio, Castelletto di Branduzzo, Corvino San Quirico, Robecco Pavese, Verretto.

References

Cities and towns in Lombardy